The Alpine Wall (Vallo Alpino) was an Italian system of fortifications along the  of Italy's northern frontier. Built in the years leading up to World War II at the direction of Italian dictator Benito Mussolini, the defensive line faced France, Switzerland, Austria, and Yugoslavia. It was defended by the "Guardia alla Frontiera" (GaF), Italian special troops.

Characteristics

The Alpine line was similar in concept to other fortifications of the same era, including the Maginot Line of France, the Siegfried Line of Germany, and the National Redoubt of Switzerland.

Italy's land frontiers were in most places mountainous and easily defended, but in the years leading up to World War II, Italy's relations with its neighbours were uneasy.  Even in its dealings with its German ally, Italy was concerned about German ambitions towards the province of South Tyrol, inhabited by a German majority.

Due to the rugged nature of the Alpine frontier, defences were confined to passes and observation posts in accessible locations.

History 

Work on the Alpine Wall began in 1931, intended to cover an arc from the Mediterranean coast at Ventimiglia in the west to Fiume on the Adriatic coast in the east. Three zones were designated at increasing distances from the frontier:
 "Zone of Security": Initial contact with the enemy.
 "Zone of Resistance": Heavier fortifications capable of resistance in isolation.
 "Zone of Alignment": Assembly area for counterattack, into which the enemy was to be directed.
Three types of fortifications were provided:
 "Type A": The largest fortifications, generally built into mountainsides.
 "Type B": Smaller point-defence fortifications.
 "Type C": Widely distributed shelters and rallying points

The work, which was carried out in secrecy using Italian labor, was a significant economic burden, resulting in 208 installations with 647 machine guns and fifty artillery pieces. Construction continued until 1942; a report by General Vittorio Ambrosio on 3 October 1942 recorded that 1,475 bunkers had been completed and 450 more were under construction. The forts were armed with a mixture of new weaponry and older equipment from World War I. Provisions were made to deal with the use of poison gas. Much of the armour was obtained from Germany in compensation for Italian military ventures on behalf of the Axis.

The Alpine Wall during World War II 
Little use was made of the Alpine Wall during World War II. During the Italian invasion of France in 1940, some western forts such as Fort Chaberton exchanged fire with their French counterparts of the Alpine Line. Chaberton was hit by French 280mm field mortars and suffered disabling damage.  In addition, some Alpine Wall fortifications were used defensively by the Germans in 1944.

After World War II 
At the end of the conflict, some of the western fortifications were destroyed. In the east former Austro-Hungarian territories that Italy acquired with the London treaty of 1915 were in 1947 awarded to Yugoslavia. Consequently, the entire eastern part of the pre-WW2 fortifications were thus on the Yugoslav side and are now on Slovenian territory.  The 1947 Paris Peace Treaty forbade the construction or expansion of fortifications within twenty kilometers of the border.

However, with Italy's membership in NATO, construction began on a new defensive line from Austria to the Adriatic along the Yugoslavian border along the Natisone and Tagliamento rivers. The new line used tank turrets in a manner similar to German defences during the previous conflict, allowing 360 degree traverse and a high rate of fire. By 1976 this system was still considered useful in any conflict short of nuclear war.

Abandonment 
The end of the Cold War brought an end to the usefulness of the Alpine Wall. The emplacements were partially stripped and sealed in 1991-1992.  Only some active fortifications have been preserved.

Arrangement 

The fortifications were primarily constructed in the flanking heights of the valleys, with works within the valleys only where they were sufficiently wide.  Anti-tank guns, artillery and machine guns were trained on prepared fields of fire, with observation stations at higher points.  Shelters for infantry were located rearwards.  A system of communications links and roads, or for higher locations, ropeways were provided for communication and supply.

Fortifications 
The individual fortifications were typically built in rock on valley sides.  Where this was not suitable, concrete was used for protection, with a minimum of openings and three to five metres of concrete thickness.  Combat blocks were to the front, with ammunition rooms behind.  Underground galleries connected the combat blocks and their support areas, such as the utility rooms, barracks, storage and command centres, with the main entry farthest to the rear. Combat areas were isolated from the rest of the structure by gas-tight doorways.  Units built after 1939 were designed to operate independently, cut off from utilities and supplies.

Fortifications were camouflaged so that they appeared to blend with the surroundings, whether doors or embrasures were open or closed.  Emergency escape routes were also provided.

Armament 
Armament typically included an anti-tank gun and a number of machine guns.  Post-war units used tank turrets.

Usual armament included:
 Machine gun, Fiat 35 in casemate or metal turret
 Machine gun, Breda 30 and Breda M37, for defense of entries to the fortifications
 Gun 57/43 RM mod. 887 on naval mounts
 Gun 75/43, ball mount in 10 cm steel slab
 Gun 47/32
 Mortar 81mm mod. 35
 Flamethrower

Fortifications were usually surrounded by minefields and barbed wire.  Where feasible, an anti-tank ditch was provided.

Guardia alla Frontiera
The Vallo Alpino was mainly defended by the 21,000 strong "Guardia alla Frontiera" (G.A.F.), a special Italian corps created in 1937.

See also 
 Atlantic Wall
 Czechoslovak border fortifications

Notes

Bibliography 
 Marco Boglione, Le Strade dei Cannoni Blu Edizioni, Torino 2005,  
Kauffmann, J.E., Jurga, Robert M. Fortress Europe: European Fortifications of World War II, 1999. 
 Alessandro Bernasconi; Giovanni Muran. Le fortificazioni del Vallo Alpino Littorio in Alto Adige Trento, editore Temi [maggio 1999], 328 pagine. 
 Alessandro Bernasconi; Giovanni Muran. Il testimone di cemento - Le fortificazioni del "Vallo Alpino Littorio" in Cadore, Carnia e Tarvisiano, Udine editore La Nuova Base Editrice [maggio 2009], 498 pagine + CD con allegati storici e tecnici. 
 Malte Koenig, Vallo del littorio. Die italienischen Verteidigungsanlagen an der Nordfront, in fortifikation. Fachblatt des Studienkreises für Internationales Festungs-, Militaer- und Schutzbauwesen 22 (2008), pp. 87–92. 
 Malte Koenig, Kooperation als Machtkampf. Das faschistische Achsenbuendnis Berlin-Rom im Krieg 1940/41, Cologne 2007, pp. 238–249.
 Josef Urthaler; Christina Niederkofler; Andrea Pozza. Bunker 2a ed., editore Athesia [2005], 2006, 244 pagine.

External links 

The Underground Fortifications of the Alpine Wall
Bunkermuzeum
Le fortificazioni del Vallo Alpino in provincia di Cuneo 
 http://www.vecio.it 
Eastern Vallo Alpino
Vallo alpino del Littorio nelle attuali Slovenia e Croazia (1920-1943) 
Endangered Italian fortifications in actual Slovenia

World War II defensive lines
Italian fascist architecture
World War II sites in Italy
Yugoslavia in World War II
World War II sites in Slovenia
National redoubts